This is a complete list of Scottish Statutory Instruments in 2012.

1-100 

 The Children's Hearings (Scotland) Act 2011 (Commencement No. 3) Order 2012 (S.S.I. 2012 No. 1 (C. 1))
 The Private Rented Housing (Scotland) Act 2011 (Commencement No. 2 and Transitional Provision) Order 2012 (S.S.I. 2012 No. 2 (C. 2))
 The Specified Products from China (Restriction on First Placing on the Market) (Scotland) Amendment Regulations 2012 (S.S.I. 2012 No. 3)
 The Sea Fish (Prohibited Methods of Fishing) (Firth of Clyde) Order 2012 (S.S.I. 2012 No. 4)
 The Fodder Plant Seed (Scotland) Amendment Regulations 2012 (S.S.I. 2012 No. 5)
 The Conservation of Salmon (River Annan Salmon Fishery District) (Scotland) Regulations 2012 (S.S.I. 2012 No. 6)
 Act of Sederunt (Fees of Sheriff Officers) (Amendment) 2012 (S.S.I. 2012 No. 7)
 Act of Sederunt (Fees of Messengers-at-Arms) (Amendment) 2012 (S.S.I. 2012 No. 8)
 The National Health Service (General Medical Services Contracts) (Scotland) Amendment Regulations 2012 (S.S.I. 2012 No. 9)
 The National Health Service (Primary Medical Services Section 17C Agreements) (Scotland) Amendment Regulations 2012 (S.S.I. 2012 No. 10)
 The Scottish Road Works Register (Prescribed Fees) Regulations 2012 (S.S.I. 2012 No. 11)
 The South West Scotland Trunk Roads (Temporary Prohibitions of Traffic and Overtaking and Temporary Speed Restrictions) (No.1) Order 2012 (S.S.I. 2012 No. 12)
 The South East Scotland Trunk Roads (Temporary Prohibitions of Traffic and Overtaking and Temporary Speed Restrictions) (No. 1) Order 2012 (S.S.I. 2012 No. 13)
 The North West Scotland Trunk Roads (Temporary Prohibitions of Traffic and Overtaking and Temporary Speed Restrictions) (No. 1) Order 2012 (S.S.I. 2012 No. 14)
 The North East Scotland Trunk Roads (Temporary Prohibitions of Traffic and Overtaking and Temporary Speed Restrictions) (No.1) Order 2012 (S.S.I. 2012 No. 15)
 The Representation of the People (Variation of Limits of Candidates’ Local Government Election Expenses) (Scotland) Order 2012 (S.S.I. 2012 No. 16)
 The A77 Trunk Road (Cairnryan) (Temporary 30 mph Speed Limit) Order 2012 (S.S.I. 2012 No. 17)
 The A84 Trunk Road (Main Street and Leny Road, Callander) (Temporary Prohibition of Waiting, Loading and Unloading) Order 2012 (S.S.I. 2012 No. 18)
 The Housing (Scotland) Act 2010 (Commencement No. 5) Order 2012 (S.S.I. 2012 No. 19 (C. 3))
 The Offensive Behaviour at Football and Threatening Communications (Scotland) Act 2012 (Commencement) Order 2012 (S.S.I. 2012 No. 20 (C. 4))
 The Public Records (Scotland) Act 2011 (Commencement No. 1) Order 2012 (S.S.I. 2012 No. 21 (C. 5))
 The Repayment of Student Loans (Scotland) Amendment Regulations 2012 (S.S.I. 2012 No. 22)
 The Children's Hearings (Scotland) Act 2011 (Commencement No. 4) Order 2012 (S.S.I. 2012 No. 23 (C. 6))
 The Less Favoured Area Support Scheme (Scotland) Amendment Regulations 2012 (S.S.I. 2012 No. 24)
 The Marine Licensing (Exempted Activities) (Scottish Inshore and Offshore Regions) Amendment Order 2012 (S.S.I. 2012 No. 25)
 The Prisons and Young Offenders Institutions (Scotland) Amendment Rules 2012 (S.S.I. 2012 No. 26)
 The Non-Domestic Rate (Scotland) Order 2012 (S.S.I. 2012 No. 27)
 The Non-Domestic Rates (Levying) (Scotland) Regulations 2012 (S.S.I. 2012 No. 28)
 The Non-Domestic Rates (Levying) (Scotland) (No. 2) Regulations 2012 (S.S.I. 2012 No. 29)
 The Title Conditions (Scotland) Act 2003 (Conservation Bodies) Amendment Order 2012 (S.S.I. 2012 No. 30)
 The Local Electoral Administration (Scotland) Act 2011 (Consequential Amendments) Order 2012 (S.S.I. 2012 No. 31)
 The Public Service Vehicles (Registration of Local Services) (Scotland) Amendment Regulations 2012 (S.S.I. 2012 No. 32)
 The Bus Service Operators Grant (Scotland) Amendment Regulations 2012 (S.S.I. 2012 No. 33)
 The Home Energy Assistance Scheme (Scotland) Amendment Regulations 2012 (S.S.I. 2012 No. 34)
 The Patient Rights (Scotland) Act 2011 (Commencement) Order 2012 (S.S.I. 2012 No. 35 (C. 7))
 The Patient Rights (Complaints Procedure and Consequential Provisions) (Scotland) Regulations 2012 (S.S.I. 2012 No. 36)
 The Potatoes Originating in Egypt (Scotland) Amendment Regulations 2012 (S.S.I. 2012 No. 37)
 The Housing (Scotland) Act 2010 (Consequential Modifications) Order 2012 (S.S.I. 2012 No. 38)
 The Housing (Scotland) Act 2010 (Commencement No. 6, Transitional and Savings Provisions) Order 2012 (S.S.I. 2012 No. 39 (C. 8))
 The Prohibited Procedures on Protected Animals (Exemptions) (Scotland) Amendment Regulations 2012 (S.S.I. 2012 No. 40)
 The Local Government Finance (Scotland) Order 2012 (S.S.I. 2012 No. 41)
 The Public Records (Scotland) Act 2011 (Commencement No. 1) Amendment Order 2012 (S.S.I. 2012 No. 42 (C. 9))
 The Scottish Public Services Ombudsman Act 2002 Amendment Order 2012 (S.S.I. 2012 No. 43)
 The Social Care and Social Work Improvement Scotland (Excepted Services) Regulations 2012 (S.S.I. 2012 No. 44)
 The Public Services Reform (Social Services Inspections) (Scotland) Amendment Regulations 2012 (S.S.I. 2012 No. 45)
 The A9 Trunk Road (Inshes Junction) (Temporary 30mph Restriction of Speed) Order 2012 (S.S.I. 2012 No. 46)
 The A9 Trunk Road (Dunkeld Junction) (Temporary Prohibition of Traffic, Temporary Prohibition of Overtaking and Temporary Speed Restriction) Order 2012 (S.S.I. 2012 No. 47)
 The Non-Domestic Rates (Enterprise Areas) (Scotland) Regulations 2012 (S.S.I. 2012 No. 48)
 The Police Grant and Variation (Scotland) Order 2012 (S.S.I. 2012 No. 49)
 The Sexual Offences Act 2003 (Prescribed Police Stations) (Scotland) Amendment Regulations 2012 (S.S.I. 2012 No. 50)
 The A82 Trunk Road (Pulpit Rock Improvement) Order 2012 (S.S.I. 2012 No. 51)
 The A82 Trunk Road (Pulpit Rock Improvement) (Stopping Up) Order 2012 (S.S.I. 2012 No. 52)
 The Water Services Charges (Billing and Collection) (Scotland) Order 2012 (S.S.I. 2012 No. 53)
 The Children's Hearings (Scotland) Act 2011 (Safeguarders Panel) Regulations 2012 (S.S.I. 2012 No. 54)
 The Equality Act 2010 (Specification of Public Authorities) (Scotland) Order 2012 (S.S.I. 2012 No. 55)
 The South East Scotland Trunk Roads (Temporary Prohibitions of Traffic and Overtaking and Temporary Speed Restrictions) (No. 2) Order 2012 (S.S.I. 2012 No. 56)
 The South West Scotland Trunk Roads (Temporary Prohibitions of Traffic and Overtaking and Temporary Speed Restrictions) (No. 2) Order 2012 (S.S.I. 2012 No. 57)
 The North East Scotland Trunk Roads (Temporary Prohibitions of Traffic and Overtaking and Temporary Speed Restrictions) (No. 2) Order 2012 (S.S.I. 2012 No. 58)
 The North West Scotland Trunk Roads (Temporary Prohibitions of Traffic and Overtaking and Temporary Speed Restrictions) (No. 2) Order 2012 (S.S.I. 2012 No. 59)
 The Scottish Local Government Elections Amendment Order 2012 (S.S.I. 2012 No. 60)
 The Representation of the People (Post-Local Government Elections Supply and Inspection of Documents) (Scotland) Amendment Regulations 2012 (S.S.I. 2012 No. 61)
 The A720 Edinburgh City Bypass and M8 (Hermiston Junction) (Speed Limit) Regulations 2012 (S.S.I. 2012 No. 62)
 The Sharks, Skates and Rays (Prohibition of Fishing, Trans-shipment and Landing) (Scotland) Order 2012 (S.S.I. 2012 No. 63)
 The Civil Legal Aid (Scotland) Amendment Regulations 2012 (S.S.I. 2012 No. 64)
 The Community Care (Joint Working etc.) (Scotland) Amendment Regulations 2012 (S.S.I. 2012 No. 65)
 The Community Care and Health (Scotland) Act 2002 (Incidental Provision) (Adult Support and Protection) Order 2012 (S.S.I. 2012 No. 66)
 The National Assistance (Sums for Personal Requirements) (Scotland) Regulations 2012 (S.S.I. 2012 No. 67)
 The National Assistance (Assessment of Resources) Amendment (Scotland) Regulations 2012 (S.S.I. 2012 No. 68)
 The National Health Service (Superannuation Scheme and Pension Scheme) (Scotland) Amendment Regulations 2012 (S.S.I. 2012 No. 69)
 The Teachers’ Superannuation (Scotland) Amendment Regulations 2012 (S.S.I. 2012 No. 70)
 The Police Pensions (Contributions) Amendment (Scotland) Regulations 2012 (S.S.I. 2012 No. 71)
 The Education (Fees, Awards and Student Support) (Miscellaneous Amendments) (Scotland) Regulations 2012 (S.S.I. 2012 No. 72)
 The National Health Service (Optical Charges and Payments) (Scotland) Amendment Regulations 2012 (S.S.I. 2012 No. 73)
 The National Health Service (Free Prescriptions and Charges for Drugs and Appliances) (Scotland) Amendment Regulations 2012 (S.S.I. 2012 No. 74)
 The Food Hygiene (Scotland) Amendment Regulations 2012 (S.S.I. 2012 No. 75)
 The Personal Injuries (NHS Charges) (Amounts) (Scotland) Amendment Regulations 2012 (S.S.I. 2012 No. 76)
 The Forestry Commissioners (Climate Change Functions) (Scotland) Order 2012 (S.S.I. 2012 No. 77)
 The Bovine Viral Diarrhoea (Scotland) Order 2012 (S.S.I. 2012 No. 78)
 The M9/A90/M90 Trunk Road (Balmedie to Tipperty) (Trunking and Detrunking) Order 2012 (S.S.I. 2012 No. 79)
 The M9/A90/M90 Trunk Road (Balmedie to Tipperty) (Side Roads) Order 2012 (S.S.I. 2012 No. 80)
 The M9/A90/M90 Trunk Road (Easter Hatton Link) (Stopping Up of Accesses) Order 2012 (S.S.I. 2012 No. 81)
 The M9/A90/M90 Trunk Road (Easter Hatton Link) (Prohibition of Specified Turns) Order 2012 (S.S.I. 2012 No. 82)
 The M9/A90/M90 Trunk Road (Balmedie to Tipperty) (Prohibition of Specified Turns) Order 2012 (S.S.I. 2012 No. 83)
 The Advice and Assistance (Assistance By Way of Representation) (Scotland) Amendment Regulations 2012 (S.S.I. 2012 No. 84)
 The Scottish Public Services Ombudsman Act 2002 Amendment (No. 2) Order 2012 (S.S.I. 2012 No. 85)
 The General Teaching Council for Scotland (Legal Assessor) Rules 2012 (S.S.I. 2012 No. 86)
 The National Health Service (Charges to Overseas Visitors) (Scotland) Amendment Regulations 2012 (S.S.I. 2012 No. 87)
 The Public Contracts (Scotland) Regulations 2012 (S.S.I. 2012 No. 88)
 The Utilities Contracts (Scotland) Regulations 2012 (S.S.I. 2012 No. 89)
 The Town and Country Planning (Continuation in force of Local Plans) (Highland) (Scotland) Order 2012 (S.S.I. 2012 No. 90)
 The Housing (Scotland) Act 2010 (Commencement No. 7 and Transitional Provision) Order 2012 (S.S.I. 2012 No. 91 (C. 10))
 The Scottish Secure Tenancies (Proceedings for Possession) (Form of Notice) Regulations 2012 (S.S.I. 2012 No. 92)
 The Scottish Secure Tenancies (Proceedings for Possession) (Confirmation of Compliance with Pre-Action Requirements) Regulations 2012 (S.S.I. 2012 No. 93)
 The Local Government Finance (Scotland) Amendment Order 2012 (S.S.I. 2012 No. 94)
 The South West Scotland Trunk Roads (Temporary Prohibitions of Traffic and Overtaking and Temporary Speed Restrictions) (No.3) Order 2012 (S.S.I. 2012 No. 95)
 The South East Scotland Trunk Roads (Temporary Prohibitions of Traffic and Overtaking and Temporary Speed Restrictions) (No.3) Order 2012 (S.S.I. 2012 No. 96)
 The North West Scotland Trunk Roads (Temporary Prohibitions of Traffic and Overtaking and Temporary Speed Restrictions) (No.3) Order 2012 (S.S.I. 2012 No. 97)
 The North East Scotland Trunk Roads (Temporary Prohibitions of Traffic and Overtaking and Temporary Speed Restrictions) (No.3) Order 2012 (S.S.I. 2012 No. 98)
 The Adoption and Children (Scotland) Act 2007 (Commencement No. 4, Transitional and Savings Provisions) Amendment Order 2012 (S.S.I. 2012 No. 99)
 Act of Sederunt (Rules of the Court of Session Amendment) (Fees of Shorthand Writers) 2012 (S.S.I. 2012 No. 100)

101-200 
 Act of Sederunt (Fees of Shorthand Writers in the Sheriff Court) (Amendment) 2012 (S.S.I. 2012 No. 101)
 The Public Services Reform (Recovery of Expenses in respect of Inspection of Independent Further Education Colleges and English Language Schools) (Scotland) Order 2012 (S.S.I. 2012 No. 102)
 The A77 Trunk Road (Cairnryan) (Temporary 30 mph Speed Limit) (No. 2) Order 2012 (S.S.I. 2012 No. 103)
 The A96 Trunk Road (Newtongarry) (Prohibition of Specified Turns) Order 2012 (S.S.I. 2012 No. 104)
 The Budget (Scotland) Act 2011 Amendment Order 2012 (S.S.I. 2012 No. 105)
 The Firemen’s Pension Scheme Amendment (Scotland) Order 2012 (S.S.I. 2012 No. 106)
 The Firefighters’ Pension Scheme (Scotland) Amendment Order 2012 (S.S.I. 2012 No. 107)
 The Public Contracts and Utilities Contracts (Scotland) Amendment Regulations 2012 (S.S.I. 2012 No. 108)
 The Community Care (Personal Care and Nursing Care) (Scotland) Amendment Regulations 2012 (S.S.I. 2012 No. 109)
 The Patient Rights (Treatment Time Guarantee) (Scotland) Regulations 2012 (S.S.I. 2012 No. 110)
 The Evidence in Civil Partnership and Divorce Actions (Scotland) Order 2012 (S.S.I. 2012 No. 111)
 The A720 Trunk Road (Edinburgh City Bypass) (Hermiston Junction to Calder Junction) (Speed Limit) Order 2012 (S.S.I. 2012 No. 112)
 The Housing Support Grant (Scotland) Order 2012 (S.S.I. 2012 No. 113)
 The Mallaig Harbour Revision (Constitution) Order 2012 (S.S.I. 2012 No. 114)
 The A77 Trunk Road (Cairnryan) (30 mph Speed Limit) Order 2012 (S.S.I. 2012 No. 115)
 The Wildlife and Natural Environment (Scotland) Act 2011 (Commencement No. 3) Order 2012 (S.S.I. 2012 No. 116 (C. 11))
 The Planning etc. (Scotland) Act 2006 (National Parks) (Consequential Provisions) Order 2012 (S.S.I. 2012 No. 117)
 The Bankruptcy Fees etc. (Scotland) Regulations 2012 (S.S.I. 2012 No. 118)
 The Food Additives (Scotland) Amendment Regulations 2012 (S.S.I. 2012 No. 119)
 The South West Scotland Trunk Roads (Temporary Prohibitions of Traffic and Overtaking and Temporary Speed Restrictions) (No. 4) Order 2012 (S.S.I. 2012 No. 120)
 The South East Scotland Trunk Roads (Temporary Prohibitions of Traffic and Overtaking and Temporary Speed Restrictions) (No. 4) Order 2012 (S.S.I. 2012 No. 121)
 The North East Scotland Trunk Roads (Temporary Prohibitions of Traffic and Overtaking and Temporary Speed Restrictions) (No. 4) Order 2012 (S.S.I. 2012 No. 122)
 The North West Scotland Trunk Roads (Temporary Prohibitions of Traffic and Overtaking and Temporary Speed Restrictions) (No. 4) Order 2012 (S.S.I. 2012 No. 123)
 The Snares (Training) (Scotland) Order 2012 (S.S.I. 2012 No. 124)
 Act of Adjournal (Criminal Procedure Rules Amendment) (Miscellaneous) 2012 (S.S.I. 2012 No. 125)
 Act of Sederunt (Rules of the Court of Session Amendment No. 2) (Miscellaneous) 2012 (S.S.I. 2012 No. 126)
 The Scottish Secure Tenancies (Proceedings for Possession) (Pre-Action Requirements) Order 2012 (S.S.I. 2012 No. 127)
 The Scottish Secure Tenancies (Repossession Orders) (Maximum Period) Order 2012 (S.S.I. 2012 No. 128)
 The Education (Provision of Information as to Schools) (Scotland) Revocation Regulations 2012 (S.S.I. 2012 No. 129)
 The Education (School and Placing Information) (Scotland) Regulations 2012 (S.S.I. 2012 No. 130)
 The Town and Country Planning (General Permitted Development) (Fish Farming) (Scotland) Amendment Order 2012 (S.S.I. 2012 No. 131)
 The Mental Health Tribunal for Scotland (Practice and Procedure) (No. 2) Amendment Rules 2012 (S.S.I. 2012 No. 132)
 The A702 Trunk Road (Former Petrol Filling Station, Hillend) (Prohibition of Specified Turns) Order 2012 (S.S.I. 2012 No. 133)
 The Edinburgh and West Lothian Trunk Roads (M9/A90/M90, M9/A9 and M8/A8) Temporary Speed Limits, Regulation and Prohibitions of Traffic Order 2012 (S.S.I. 2012 No. 134)
 The Food Protection (Emergency Prohibitions) (Dalgety Bay) (Scotland) Order 2012 (S.S.I. 2012 No. 135)
 Act of Sederunt (Actions for removing from heritable property) 2012 (S.S.I. 2012 No. 136)
 The Road Traffic (Permitted Parking Area and Special Parking Area) (East Ayrshire Council) Designation Order 2012 (S.S.I. 2012 No. 137)
 The Parking Attendants (Wearing of Uniforms) (East Ayrshire Council Parking Area) Regulations 2012 (S.S.I. 2012 No. 138)
 The Road Traffic (Parking Adjudicators) (East Ayrshire Council) Regulations 2012 (S.S.I. 2012 No. 139)
 The Road Traffic (Permitted Parking Area and Special Parking Area) (South Ayrshire Council) Designation Order 2012 (S.S.I. 2012 No. 140)
 The Parking Attendants (Wearing of Uniforms) (South Ayrshire Council Parking Area) Regulations 2012 (S.S.I. 2012 No. 141)
 The Road Traffic (Parking Adjudicators) (South Ayrshire Council) Regulations 2012 (S.S.I. 2012 No. 142)
 The Rural Payments (Appeals) (Scotland) Amendment Regulations 2012 (S.S.I. 2012 No. 143)
 Act of Sederunt (Summary Cause Rules Amendment) (Personal Injuries Actions) 2012 (S.S.I. 2012 No. 144)
 The A823(M) Pitreavie Spur Trunk Road (Variable Speed Limits) Regulations 2012 (S.S.I. 2012 No. 145)
 The Fire and Rescue Services (Framework) (Scotland) Order 2012 (S.S.I. 2012 No. 146)
 The M9/A90/M90 Trunk Road (Kirkliston to Halbeath) (Variable Speed Limits and Actively Managed Hard Shoulder) Regulations 2012 (S.S.I. 2012 No. 147)
 The Waste (Scotland) Regulations 2012 (S.S.I. 2012 No. 148)
 The Property Factors (Scotland) Act 2011 (Commencement No. 2 and Transitional) Order 2012 (S.S.I. 2012 No. 149 (C. 12))
 The Private Rented Housing (Scotland) Act 2011 (Commencement No. 3) Order 2012 (S.S.I. 2012 No. 150 (C. 13))
 The Private Landlord Registration (Information and Fees) (Scotland) Amendment Regulations 2012 (S.S.I. 2012 No. 151)
 The Legal Services (Scotland) Act 2010 (Commencement No. 2 and Transitional Provisions) Order 2012 (S.S.I. 2012 No. 152 (C. 14))
 The Licensed Legal Services (Complaints and Compensation Arrangements) (Scotland) Regulations 2012 (S.S.I. 2012 No. 153)
 The Licensed Legal Services (Interests in Licensed Providers) (Scotland) Regulations 2012 (S.S.I. 2012 No. 154)
 The Licensed Legal Services (Maximum Penalty and Interest in respect of Approved Regulators) (Scotland) Regulations 2012 (S.S.I. 2012 No. 155)
 The South West Scotland Trunk Roads (Temporary Prohibitions of Traffic and Overtaking and Temporary Speed Restrictions) (No. 5) Order 2012 (S.S.I. 2012 No. 156)
 The South East Scotland Trunk Roads (Temporary Prohibitions of Traffic and Overtaking and Temporary Speed Restrictions) (No. 5) Order 2012 (S.S.I. 2012 No. 157)
 The North West Scotland Trunk Roads (Temporary Prohibitions of Traffic and Overtaking and Temporary Speed Restrictions) (No. 5) Order 2012 (S.S.I. 2012 No. 158)
 The North East Scotland Trunk Roads (Temporary Prohibitions of Traffic and Overtaking and Temporary Speed Restrictions) (No. 5) Order 2012 (S.S.I. 2012 No. 159)
 The Criminal Justice and Licensing (Scotland) Act 2010 (Commencement No. 10 and Saving Provisions) Order 2012 (S.S.I. 2012 No. 160 (C. 15))
 The Snares (Training) (Scotland) (No. 2) Order 2012 (S.S.I. 2012 No. 161)
 The Equality Act 2010 (Specific Duties) (Scotland) Regulations 2012 (S.S.I. 2012 No. 162)
 The National Health Service Superannuation Scheme etc. (Miscellaneous Amendments) (Scotland) Regulations 2012 (S.S.I. 2012 No. 163)
 The Sports Grounds and Sporting Events (Designation) (Scotland) Amendment Order 2012 (S.S.I. 2012 No. 164)
 The Town and Country Planning (Development Management Procedure) (Scotland) Amendment Regulations 2012 (S.S.I. 2012 No. 165)
 The European Fisheries Fund (Grants) (Scotland) Amendment Regulations 2012 (S.S.I. 2012 No. 166)
 The Parole Board (Scotland) Amendment Rules 2012 (S.S.I. 2012 No. 167)
 The A96 Trunk Road (High Street, Elgin) (Special Event) (Temporary Prohibition of Traffic) Order 2012 (S.S.I. 2012 No. 168)
 The M8/A8 and A737/A738 Trunk Roads (White Cart Viaduct) (Temporary Prohibition of Traffic, Temporary Prohibition of Overtaking and Temporary Speed Restriction) Revocation Order 2012 (S.S.I. 2012 No. 169)
 The Adults with Incapacity (Requirements for Signing Medical Treatment Certificates) (Scotland) Amendment Regulations 2012 (S.S.I. 2012 No. 170)
 The National Health Service (Travelling Expenses and Remission of Charges) (Scotland) (No. 2) Amendment Regulations 2012 (S.S.I. 2012 No. 171)
 The Individual Learning Account (Scotland) Amendment Regulations 2012 (S.S.I. 2012 No. 172)
 The Wildlife and Countryside Act 1981 (Exceptions to section 14) (Scotland) Order 2012 (S.S.I. 2012 No. 173)
 The Wildlife and Countryside Act 1981 (Keeping and Release and Notification Requirements) (Scotland) Order 2012 (S.S.I. 2012 No. 174)
 The Wildlife and Natural Environment (Scotland) Act 2011 (Commencement No. 4, Savings and Transitional Provisions) Order 2012 (S.S.I. 2012 No. 175 (C. 16))
 The Poultry Health Scheme (Fees) (Scotland) Regulations 2012 (S.S.I. 2012 No. 176)
 The Trade in Animals and Related Products (Scotland) Regulations 2012 (S.S.I. 2012 No. 177)
 The African Horse Sickness (Scotland) Order 2012 (S.S.I. 2012 No. 178)
 The Animal By-Products (Miscellaneous Amendments) (Scotland) Regulations 2012 (S.S.I. 2012 No. 179)
 The Homeowner Housing Panel (Applications and Decisions) (Scotland) Regulations 2012 (S.S.I. 2012 No. 180)
 The Property Factors (Registration) (Scotland) Regulations 2012 (S.S.I. 2012 No. 181)
 The Leader Grants (Scotland) Amendment Regulations 2012 (S.S.I. 2012 No. 182)
 The Marine Licensing (Fees) (Scotland) Amendment Regulations 2012 (S.S.I. 2012 No. 183)
 The Bluetongue (Scotland) Amendment Order 2012 (S.S.I. 2012 No. 184)
 The A830 Trunk Road (Craigag Bridge) (Temporary Prohibition of Traffic) Order 2012 (S.S.I. 2012 No. 185)
 The A99 (South Road, Wick) (Temporary Prohibition of Waiting, Loading and Unloading) Order 2012 (S.S.I. 2012 No. 186)
 Act of Adjournal (Criminal Procedure Rules Amendment No. 2) (Miscellaneous) 2012 (S.S.I. 2012 No. 187)
 Act of Sederunt (Sheriff Court Rules) (Miscellaneous Amendments) 2012 (S.S.I. 2012 No. 188)
 Act of Sederunt (Rules of the Court of Session Amendment No. 3) (Miscellaneous) 2012 (S.S.I. 2012 No. 189)
 The Energy Performance of Buildings (Scotland) Amendment Regulations 2012 (S.S.I. 2012 No. 190)
 The Energy Act 2011 (Commencement No. 1) (Scotland) Order 2012 (S.S.I. 2012 No. 191 (C. 17))
 The Water Services etc. (Scotland) Act 2005 (Commencement No. 6) Order 2012 (S.S.I. 2012 No. 192 (C. 18))
 The Public Appointments and Public Bodies etc. (Scotland) Act 2003 (Treatment of Office or Body as Specified Authority) Order 2012 (S.S.I. 2012 No. 193)
 The Town and Country Planning (Continuation in force of South Lanarkshire Local Plan) (Scotland) Order 2012 (S.S.I. 2012 No. 194)
 The A83 Trunk Road (Poltalloch Street, Lochgilphead) (Special Event) (Temporary Prohibition of Traffic) Order 2012 (S.S.I. 2012 No. 195)
 The Official Statistics (Scotland) Amendment Order 2012 (S.S.I. 2012 No. 196)
 The Parole Board (Scotland) Amendment (No. 2) Rules 2012 (S.S.I. 2012 No. 197)
 The Trade in Animals and Related Products (Scotland) Amendment Order 2012 (S.S.I. 2012 No. 198)
 The Bluetongue (Scotland) Order 2012 (S.S.I. 2012 No. 199)
 The M9/A90/M90 Trunk Road (Gairneybridge to Milnathort) (Temporary 50 mph and 30 mph Speed Restrictions) Order 2012 (S.S.I. 2012 No. 200)

201-300 
 The South West Scotland Trunk Roads (Temporary Prohibitions of Traffic and Overtaking and Temporary Speed Restrictions) (No. 6) Order 2012 (S.S.I. 2012 No. 201)
 The South East Scotland Trunk Roads (Temporary Prohibitions of Traffic and Overtaking and Temporary Speed Restrictions) (No. 6) Order 2012 (S.S.I. 2012 No. 202)
 The North West Scotland Trunk Roads (Temporary Prohibitions of Traffic and Overtaking and Temporary Speed Restrictions) (No. 6) Order 2012 (S.S.I. 2012 No. 203)
 The North East Scotland Trunk Roads (Temporary Prohibitions of Traffic and Overtaking and Temporary Speed Restrictions) (No. 6) Order 2012 (S.S.I. 2012 No. 204)
 The Wildlife and Countryside Act 1981 (Exceptions to section 14) (Scotland) Amendment Order 2012 (S.S.I. 2012 No. 205)
 The Wildlife and Countryside Act 1981 (Keeping and Release and Notification Requirements) (Scotland) Amendment Order 2012 (S.S.I. 2012 No. 206)
 The A96 Trunk Road (Castle Stuart) (Temporary 30 mph Speed Restriction) Order 2012 (S.S.I. 2012 No. 207)
 The Energy Performance of Buildings (Scotland) Amendment (No. 2) Regulations 2012 (S.S.I. 2012 No. 208)
 The Building (Scotland) Amendment Regulations 2012 (S.S.I. 2012 No. 209)
 The Annual Close Time (Permitted Periods of Fishing) (River Dee (Aberdeenshire) Salmon Fishery District) Order 2012 (S.S.I. 2012 No. 210)
 The Mental Health (Safety and Security) (Scotland) Amendment Regulations 2012 (S.S.I. 2012 No. 211)
 The Legal Services (Scotland) Act 2010 (Ancillary Provision) Regulations 2012 (S.S.I. 2012 No. 212)
 The Licensed Legal Services (Specification of Regulated Professions) (Scotland) Regulations 2012 (S.S.I. 2012 No. 213)
 The Green Deal (Acknowledgment) (Scotland) Regulations 2012 (S.S.I. 2012 No. 214)
 The Wildlife and Natural Environment (Scotland) Act 2011 (Consequential Modifications) Order 2012 (S.S.I. 2012 No. 215)
 The Fundable Bodies (Scotland) Order 2012 (S.S.I. 2012 No. 216)
 The Property Factors (Code of Conduct) (Scotland) Order 2012 (S.S.I. 2012 No. 217)
 The Public Services Reform (Scotland) Act 2010 (Commencement No. 6) Order 2012 (S.S.I. 2012 No. 218 (C. 19))
 The Charities Restricted Funds Reorganisation (Scotland) Regulations 2012 (S.S.I. 2012 No. 219)
 The Charities Reorganisation (Scotland) Amendment Regulations 2012 (S.S.I. 2012 No. 220)
 Act of Sederunt (Sheriff Court Rules) (Miscellaneous Amendments) (No. 2) 2012 (S.S.I. 2012 No. 221)
 The A77 Trunk Road (Turnberry) (Temporary 30 mph Restriction Limit) Order 2012 (S.S.I. 2012 No. 222)
 The A96 Trunk Road (High Street, Fochabers) (Temporary Prohibition of Traffic) Order 2012 (S.S.I. 2012 No. 223)
 The South West Scotland Trunk Roads (Temporary Prohibitions of Traffic and Overtaking and Temporary Speed Restrictions) (No. 7) Order 2012 (S.S.I. 2012 No. 224)
 The South East Scotland Trunk Roads (Temporary Prohibitionsof Traffic and Overtaking and Temporary Speed Restrictions)(No. 7) Order 2012 (S.S.I. 2012 No. 225)
 The North West Scotland Trunk Roads (Temporary Prohibitionsof Traffic and Overtaking and Temporary Speed Restrictions)(No. 7) Order 2012 (S.S.I. 2012 No. 226)
 The North East Scotland Trunk Roads (Temporary Prohibitions of Traffic and Overtaking and Temporary Speed Restrictions) (No. 7) Order 2012 (S.S.I. 2012 No. 227)
 The Conservation (Natural Habitats, &c.) Amendment (Scotland) Regulations 2012 (S.S.I. 2012 No. 228)
 The M9/A90/M90 Trunk Road (North Anderson Drive, Aberdeen (Prohibition of U-Turns) Order 2012 (S.S.I. 2012 No. 229)
 The A99 (South Road, Wick) (Temporary Prohibition of Waiting, Loading and Unloading) (No. 2) Order 2012 (S.S.I. 2012 No. 230)
 The A9 Trunk Road (Inshes Junction) (30 mph Speed Limit) Order 2012 (S.S.I. 2012 No. 231)
 The South West Scotland Trunk Roads (Temporary Prohibitions of Traffic and Overtaking and Temporary Speed Restrictions) (No. 8) Order 2012 (S.S.I. 2012 No. 232)
 The South East Scotland Trunk Roads (Temporary Prohibitions of Traffic and Overtaking and Temporary Speed Restrictions) (No. 8) Order 2012 (S.S.I. 2012 No. 233)
 The North West Scotland Trunk Roads (Temporary Prohibitions of Traffic and Overtaking and Temporary Speed Restrictions) (No. 8) Order 2012 (S.S.I. 2012 No. 234)
 The North East Scotland Trunk Roads (Temporary Prohibitions of Traffic and Overtaking and Temporary Speed Restrictions) (No. 8) Order 2012 (S.S.I. 2012 No. 235)
 The Local Government Pension Scheme (Administration) (Scotland) Amendment Regulations 2012 (S.S.I. 2012 No. 236)
 The Elmwood College, Oatridge College and The Barony College (Transfer and Closure) (Scotland) Order 2012 (S.S.I. 2012 No. 237)
 The Jewel and Esk College and Stevenson College Edinburgh (Transfer and Closure) (Scotland) Order 2012 (S.S.I. 2012 No. 238)
 The A82 Trunk Road (Crianlarich Bypass) Order 2012 (S.S.I. 2012 No. 239)
 The A82 Trunk Road (Crianlarich Bypass) (Side Road) Order 2012 (S.S.I. 2012 No. 240)
 The A82 Trunk Road (Crianlarich Western Bypass) Revocation Order 2012 (S.S.I. 2012 No. 241)
 The A82 Trunk Road (Crianlarich Western Bypass) (Side Roads) Revocation Order 2012 (S.S.I. 2012 No. 242)
 The Bathing Waters (Scotland) Amendment Regulations 2012 (S.S.I. 2012 No. 243)
 The A92 Trunk Road (Leuchars) (Temporary 30 mph Speed Restriction) Order 2012 (S.S.I. 2012 No. 244)
 Act of Sederunt (Registration Appeal Court) 2012 (S.S.I. 2012 No. 245)
 The Children's Hearings (Scotland) Act 2011 (Commencement No. 5) Order 2012 (S.S.I. 2012 No. 246 (C. 20))
 The Public Records (Scotland) Act 2011 (Commencement No. 2) Order 2012 (S.S.I. 2012 No. 247 (C. 21))
 The A9 (Olrig Street/Smith Terrace/Pennyland Terrace, Thurso) (Temporary Prohibition of Waiting and Loading) Order 2012 (S.S.I. 2012 No. 248)
 The Criminal Cases (Punishment and Review) (Scotland) Act 2012 (Commencement, Transitional and Savings) Order 2012 (S.S.I. 2012 No. 249 (C. 22))
 The Road Works (Inspection Fees) (Scotland) Amendment Regulations 2012 (S.S.I. 2012 No. 250)
 The A82 Trunk Road (Drumnadrochit to Fort Augustus) (Temporary Prohibition of Traffic) Order 2012 (S.S.I. 2012 No. 251)
 The Children's Hearings (Scotland) Act 2011 (Commencement No. 6) Order 2012 (S.S.I. 2012 No. 252 (C. 23))
 The Police and Fire Reform (Scotland) Act 2012 (Commencement No. 1, Transitional, Transitory and Saving Provisions) Order 2012 (S.S.I. 2012 No. 253 (C. 24))
 The South West Scotland Trunk Roads (Temporary Prohibitions of Traffic and Overtaking and Temporary Speed Restrictions) (No. 9) Order 2012 (S.S.I. 2012 No. 254)
 The South East Scotland Trunk Roads (Temporary Prohibitions of Traffic and Overtaking and Temporary Speed Restrictions) (No.9) Order 2012 (S.S.I. 2012 No. 255)
 The North West Scotland Trunk Roads (Temporary Prohibitions of Traffic and Overtaking and Temporary Speed Restrictions) (No. 9) Order 2012 (S.S.I. 2012 No. 256)
 The North East Scotland Trunk Roads (Temporary Prohibitions of Traffic and Overtaking and Temporary Speed Restrictions) (No. 9) Order 2012 (S.S.I. 2012 No. 257)
 The Housing (Scotland) Act 2001 (Assistance to Registered Social Landlords and Other Persons) (Grants) Amendment Regulations 2012 (S.S.I. 2012 No. 258)
 The Town and Country Planning (Marine Fish Farming) (Scotland) Amendment Regulations 2012 (S.S.I. 2012 No. 259)
 The Town and Country Planning (Prescribed Date) (Scotland) Regulations 2012 (S.S.I. 2012 No. 260)
 The Glasgow Commonwealth Games Act 2008 (Commencement No. 3) Order 2012 (S.S.I. 2012 No. 261 (C. 25))
 The Fraserburgh Harbour Revision (Constitution) Order 2012 (S.S.I. 2012 No. 262)
 The Food Protection (Emergency Prohibitions) (Radioactivity in Sheep) and the Export of Sheep (Prohibition) Revocation (Scotland) Order 2012 (S.S.I. 2012 No. 263)
 The Fishing Boats (Satellite-tracking Devices) (Scotland) Scheme 2012 (S.S.I. 2012 No. 264)
 The Land Registration etc. (Scotland) Act 2012 (Commencement No. 1) Order 2012 (S.S.I. 2012 No. 265 (C. 26))
 The Plant Health (Scotland) Amendment Order 2012 (S.S.I. 2012 No. 266)
 The Private Rented Housing (Scotland) Act 2011 (Commencement No. 4) Order 2012 (S.S.I. 2012 No. 267 (C. 27))
 The A737 Trunk Road (Kilwinning) (30 mph Speed Limit) and Kilwinning Academy and Abbey Primary School (Part-Time 20 mph Speed Limit) Order 2012 (S.S.I. 2012 No. 268)
 The Property Factors (Scotland) Act 2011 (Modification) Order 2012 (S.S.I. 2012 No. 269)
 Act of Sederunt (Rules of the Court of Session Amendment No. 4) (Fees of Solicitors) 2012 (S.S.I. 2012 No. 270)
 Act of Sederunt (Sheriff Court Rules) (Miscellaneous Amendments) (No. 3) 2012 (S.S.I. 2012 No. 271)
 Act of Adjournal (Amendment of the Criminal Procedure (Scotland) Act 1995) (Transcripts) 2012 (S.S.I. 2012 No. 272)
 Act of Sederunt (Actions for removing from heritable property) (Amendment) 2012 (S.S.I. 2012 No. 273)
 The Criminal Proceedings etc. (Reform) (Scotland) Act 2007 (Commencement No. 10) Order 2012 (S.S.I. 2012 No. 274 (C. 28))
 Act of Sederunt (Rules of the Court of Session Amendment No. 5) (Miscellaneous) 2012 (S.S.I. 2012 No. 275)
 The Criminal Legal Aid (Scotland) (Fees) Amendment Regulations 2012 (S.S.I. 2012 No. 276)
 The North West Scotland Trunk Roads (Temporary Prohibitions of Traffic and Overtaking and Temporary Speed Restrictions) (No. 10) Order 2012 (S.S.I. 2012 No. 277)
 The North East Scotland Trunk Roads (Temporary Prohibitions of Traffic and Overtaking and Temporary Speed Restrictions) (No. 10) Order 2012 (S.S.I. 2012 No. 278)
 The South West Scotland Trunk Roads (Temporary Prohibitions of Traffic and Overtaking and Temporary Speed Restrictions) (No. 10) Order 2012 (S.S.I. 2012 No. 279)
 The South East Scotland Trunk Roads (Temporary Prohibitions of Traffic and Overtaking and Temporary Speed Restrictions) (No. 10) Order 2012 (S.S.I. 2012 No. 280)
 The Wildlife and Natural Environment (Scotland) Act 2011 (Commencement No. 2) Amendment (No. 2) Order 2012 (S.S.I. 2012 No. 281 (C. 29))
 The Snares (Identification Numbers and Tags) (Scotland) Order 2012 (S.S.I. 2012 No. 282)
 The Housing (Scotland) Act 2010 (Commencement No. 8 and Saving Provision) Order 2012 (S.S.I. 2012 No. 283 (C. 30))
 The INSPIRE (Scotland) Amendment Regulations 2012 (S.S.I. 2012 No. 284)
 The Town and Country Planning (General Permitted Development) (Fish Farming) (Scotland) Amendment (No. 2) Order 2012 (S.S.I. 2012 No. 285)
 The Road Works (Maintenance) (Scotland) Amendment Regulations 2012 (S.S.I. 2012 No. 286)
 The Population (Statistics) Act 1938 Modifications (Scotland) Order 2012 (S.S.I. 2012 No. 287)
 The Crofting Reform (Scotland) Act 2010 (Commencement No. 3, Transitory, Transitional and Savings Provisions) Order 2012 (S.S.I. 2012 No. 288 (C. 31))
 The Adults with Incapacity (Public Guardian’s Fees) (Scotland) Amendment Regulations 2012 (S.S.I. 2012 No. 289)
 The Court of Session etc. Fees Amendment Order 2012 (S.S.I. 2012 No. 290)
 The High Court of Justiciary Fees Amendment Order 2012 (S.S.I. 2012 No. 291)
 The Justice of the Peace Court Fees (Scotland) Order 2012 (S.S.I. 2012 No. 292)
 The Sheriff Court Fees Amendment Order 2012 (S.S.I. 2012 No. 293)
 The Crofting Register (Scotland) Rules 2012 (S.S.I. 2012 No. 294)
 The Crofting Register (Fees) (Scotland) Order 2012 (S.S.I. 2012 No. 295)
 The Crofting Register (Notice of First Registration) (Scotland) Order 2012 (S.S.I. 2012 No. 296)
 The Crofting Register (Transfer of Ownership) (Scotland) Regulations 2012 (S.S.I. 2012 No. 297)
 The A85 Trunk Road (Oban) (Temporary Prohibitions) Order 2012 (S.S.I. 2012 No. 298)
 The A96 Trunk Road (Church Road, Keith) (Temporary Prohibition of Traffic) Order 2012 (S.S.I. 2012 No. 299)
 Act of Adjournal (Criminal Procedure Rules Amendment No. 3) (Procedural Hearings in Appeals from Solemn Proceedings) 2012 (S.S.I. 2012 No. 300)

301-400 

 The International Recovery of Maintenance (Hague Convention 2007) (Scotland) Regulations 2012 (S.S.I. 2012 No. 301)
 The Inverness Harbour Revision (Constitution) Order 2012 (S.S.I. 2012 No. 302)
 The Council Tax Reduction (Scotland) Regulations 2012 (S.S.I. 2012 No. 303)
 The Criminal Justice and Licensing (Scotland) Act 2010 (Incidental Provisions) Order 2012 (S.S.I. 2012 No. 304)
 The Criminal Legal Aid (Scotland) (Fees) Amendment (No. 2) Regulations 2012 (S.S.I. 2012 No. 305)
 The Housing (Scotland) Act 2001 (Assistance to Registered Social Landlords and Other Persons) (Grants) Amendment Revocation Regulations 2012 (S.S.I. 2012 No. 306)
 The Rural Development Contracts (Rural Priorities) (Scotland) Amendment Regulations 2012 (S.S.I. 2012 No. 307)
 The Diligence against Earnings (Variation) (Scotland) Regulations 2012 (S.S.I. 2012 No. 308)
 The South West Scotland Trunk Roads (Temporary Prohibitions of Traffic and Overtaking and Temporary Speed Restrictions) (No. 11) Order 2012 (S.S.I. 2012 No. 309)
 The South East Scotland Trunk Roads (Temporary Prohibitions of Traffic and Overtaking and Temporary Speed Restrictions) (No. 11) Order 2012 (S.S.I. 2012 No. 310)
 The North West Scotland Trunk Roads (Temporary Prohibitions of Traffic and Overtaking and Temporary Speed Restrictions) (No. 11) Order 2012 (S.S.I. 2012 No. 311)
 The North East Scotland Trunk Roads (Temporary Prohibitions of Traffic and Overtaking and Temporary Speed Restrictions) (No. 11) Order 2012 (S.S.I. 2012 No. 312)
 The Fife Area Trunk Roads (M9/A90/M90, A823(M) and A92) Temporary 40 mph Speed Restriction Order 2012 (S.S.I. 2012 No. 313)
 The Fife Area Trunk Roads (M9/A90/M90, A985, A823(M) and A92) Temporary Regulation and Prohibitions of Traffic and Pedestrians Order 2012 (S.S.I. 2012 No. 314)
 The Energy Performance of Buildings (Scotland) Amendment (No. 3) Regulations 2012 (S.S.I. 2012 No. 315)
 The Police Grant (Variation) (Scotland) Order 2012 (S.S.I. 2012 No. 316)
 The A77 Trunk Road (Dalrymple Street, Girvan) (Temporary Prohibition of Traffic) Order 2012 (S.S.I. 2012 No. 317)
 The Materials and Articles in Contact with Food (Scotland) Regulations 2012 (S.S.I. 2012 No. 318)
 The Council Tax Reduction (State Pension Credit) (Scotland) Regulations 2012 (S.S.I. 2012 No. 319)
 The M74 Motorway (Fullarton Road to the M8 West of Kingston Bridge) (Speed Limit) Regulations 2012 (S.S.I. 2012 No. 320)
 The Welfare of Animals at the Time of Killing (Scotland) Regulations 2012 (S.S.I. 2012 No. 321)
 The Court Fees (Miscellaneous Amendments) Scotland Order 2012 (S.S.I. 2012 No. 322)
 The Glasgow Commonwealth Games Act 2008 (Ticket Touting Offence) (Exceptions for Use of Internet etc.) (Scotland) Regulations 2012 (S.S.I. 2012 No. 323)
 The Civic Government (Scotland) Act 1982 (Metal Dealers’ Exemption Warrants) Order 2012 (S.S.I. 2012 No. 324)
 The Town and Country Planning (Miscellaneous Amendments) (Scotland) Regulations 2012 (S.S.I. 2012 No. 325)
 The Plant Health (Scotland) Amendment (No. 2) Order 2012 (S.S.I. 2012 No. 326)
 The Crofting Register (Scotland) Amendment Rules 2012 (S.S.I. 2012 No. 327)
 The Crofting Register (Fees) (Scotland) Amendment Order 2012 (S.S.I. 2012 No. 328)
 The Rent (Scotland) Act 1984 (Premiums) Regulations 2012 (S.S.I. 2012 No. 329)
 The Homelessness (Abolition of Priority Need Test) (Scotland) Order 2012 (S.S.I. 2012 No. 330)
 The Housing Support Services (Homelessness) (Scotland) Regulations 2012 (S.S.I. 2012 No. 331)
 The Fire (Scotland) Act 2005 (Relevant Premises) Regulations 2012 (S.S.I. 2012 No. 332)
 The Police and Fire Reform (Scotland) Act 2012 (Commencement No. 2, Transitory and Transitional Provisions and Appointed Day) Order 2012 (S.S.I. 2012 No. 333 (C. 32))
 The Children's Hearings (Scotland) Act 2011 (Child Protection Emergency Measures) Regulations 2012 (S.S.I. 2012 No. 334)
 The Children's Hearings (Scotland) Act 2011 (Rights of Audience of the Principal Reporter) Regulations 2012 (S.S.I. 2012 No. 335)
 The Children's Hearings (Scotland) Act 2011 (Safeguarders: Further Provision) Regulations 2012 (S.S.I. 2012 No. 336)
 The Children's Hearings (Scotland) Act 2011 (Appeals against Dismissal by SCRA) Regulations 2012 (S.S.I. 2012 No. 337)
 The Council Tax (Administration and Enforcement) (Scotland) Amendment Regulations 2012 (S.S.I. 2012 No. 338)
 The Council Tax (Exempt Dwellings) (Scotland) Amendment Order 2012 (S.S.I. 2012 No. 339)
 Act of Sederunt (Fees of Messengers-at-Arms) (Amendment) (No. 2) 2012 (S.S.I. 2012 No. 340)
 Act of Sederunt (Fees of Sheriff Officers) (Amendment) (No. 2) 2012 (S.S.I. 2012 No. 341)
 The Scottish Local Government Elections Amendment (No. 2) Order 2012 (S.S.I. 2012 No. 342)
 The M9/A90/M90 Trunk Road (Humbie Rail Bridge to M9 Junction 1a) (Variable Speed Limits and Actively Managed Hard Shoulder) Regulations 2012 (S.S.I. 2012 No. 343)
 The M9/A9 Trunk Road (Newbridge to Winchburgh) (Variable Speed Limits and Actively Managed Hard Shoulder) Regulations 2012 (S.S.I. 2012 No. 344)
 The Banchory and Crathes Light Railway Order 2012 (S.S.I. 2012 No. 345)
 The Budget (Scotland) Act 2012 Amendment Order 2012 (S.S.I. 2012 No. 346)
 The Local Government Pension Scheme (Miscellaneous Amendments) (Scotland) Regulations 2012 (S.S.I. 2012 No. 347)
 The Shetland Islands Regulated Fishery (Scotland) Order 2012 (S.S.I. 2012 No. 348)
 The Marketing of Bananas (Scotland) Regulations 2012 (S.S.I. 2012 No. 349)
 The Port of Cairnryan Harbour Revision Order 2012 (S.S.I. 2012 No. 350)
 The A702 Trunk Road (Biggar High Street) (Temporary Prohibition of Traffic) Order 2012 (S.S.I. 2012 No. 351)
 The Non-Domestic Rate (Scotland) (No. 2) Order 2012 (S.S.I. 2012 No. 352)
 The Non-Domestic Rates (Levying) (Scotland) (No. 3) Regulations 2012 (S.S.I. 2012 No. 353)
 The Police Act 1997 (Criminal Records) (Scotland) Amendment Regulations 2012 (S.S.I. 2012 No. 354)
 The Welfare of Animals at the Time of Killing (Scotland) Amendment Regulations 2012 (S.S.I. 2012 No. 355)
 The South West Scotland Trunk Roads (Temporary Prohibitions of Traffic and Overtaking and Temporary Speed Restrictions) (No. 12) Order 2012 (S.S.I. 2012 No. 356)
 The South East Scotland Trunk Roads (Temporary Prohibitions of Traffic and Overtaking and Temporary Speed Restrictions) (No. 12) Order 2012 (S.S.I. 2012 No. 357)
 The North West Scotland Trunk Roads (Temporary Prohibitions of Traffic and Overtaking and Temporary Speed Restrictions) (No. 12) Order 2012 (S.S.I. 2012 No. 358)
 The North East Scotland Trunk Roads (Temporary Prohibitions of Traffic and Overtaking and Temporary Speed Restrictions) (No. 12) Order 2012 (S.S.I. 2012 No. 359)
 The Pollution Prevention and Control (Scotland) Regulations 2012 (S.S.I. 2012 No. 360)

External links 
 Scottish Statutory Instrument List
 http://www.legislation.gov.uk/ssi/2012

2012
Statutory Instruments
Scotland Statutory Instruments